Actizera is a genus of butterflies in the family Lycaenidae which are found in the Afrotropical realm.

Species
Actizera atrigemmata (Butler, 1878)
Actizera drucei (Bethune-Baker, 1906)
Actizera lucida (Trimen, 1883)
Actizera stellata (Trimen, 1883)

External links

Actizera at funet
 Seitz, A. Die Gross-Schmetterlinge der Erde 13: Die Afrikanischen Tagfalter. Plate XIII 74

Polyommatini
Lycaenidae genera